Profit margin is a measure of profitability. It is calculated by finding the profit as a percentage of the revenue.

There are 3 types of profit margins: gross profit margin, operating profit margin and net profit margin.

 Gross Profit Margin is calculated as gross profit divided by net sales (percentage). Gross Profit is calculated by deducting the cost of goods sold (COGS) from the revenue, that is all the direct costs. This margin compares revenue to variable cost. It is calculated as:   
 Operating Profit Margin includes the cost of goods sold and is the earning before interest and taxes (EBIT) known as operating income divided by revenue. It is calculated as: 
 Net profit margin is net profit divided by revenue. Net profit is calculated as revenue minus all expenses from total sales.

Overview 
Profit margin is calculated with selling price (or revenue) taken as base times 100. It is the percentage of selling price that is turned into profit, whereas "profit percentage" or "markup" is the percentage of cost price that one gets as profit on top of cost price. While selling something one should know what percentage of profit one will get on a particular investment, so companies calculate profit percentage to find the ratio of profit to cost.

The profit margin is used mostly for internal comparison. It is difficult to accurately compare the net profit ratio for different entities. Individual businesses' operating and financing arrangements vary so much that different entities are bound to have different levels of expenditure, so that comparison of one with another can have little meaning.  A low profit margin indicates a low margin of safety: higher risk that a decline in sales will erase profits and result in a net loss, or a negative margin.

Profit margin is an indicator of a company's pricing strategies and how well it controls costs. Differences in competitive strategy and product mix cause the profit margin to vary among different companies.
 If an investor makes  revenue and it cost them  to earn it, when they take their cost away they are left with 90% margin. They made 900% profit on their  investment.
 If an investor makes  revenue and it cost them  to earn it, when they take their cost away they are left with 50% margin. They made 100% profit on their  investment.
 If an investor makes  revenue and it cost them  to earn it, when they take their cost away they are left with 10% margin. They made 11.11% profit on their  investment.

Profit Percentage 
On the other hand, profit percentage is calculated with cost taken as base:

Suppose that something is bought for $40 and sold for $100.

 (profit divided by cost).

If the revenue is the same as the cost, profit percentage is 0%. The result above or below 100% can be calculated as the percentage of return on investment. In this example, the return on investment is a multiple of 1.5 of the investment, corresponding to a 150% gain.

Importance of Profit Margin 
Profit margin in an economy reflects the profitability of any business and enables relative comparisons between small and large businesses. It is a standard measure to evaluate the potential and capacity of a business in generating profits. These margins help business determine their pricing strategies for goods and services. The pricing is influenced by the cost of their products and the expected profit margin. pricing errors which create cash flow challenges can be detected using profit margin concept and prevent potential challenges and losses in an entity. 

Profit Margin is also used by businesses and companies to study the seasonal patterns and changes in the performance and further detect operational challenges. For example, a negative or zero profit margin indicates that the sales of a business does not suffice or it is failing to manage its expenses. This encourages business owners to identify the areas which inhibit growth such as inventory accumulation, under-utilized resources or high cost of production.

Profit Margins are important whilst seeking credit and is often used as collateral. They are important to investors who base their predictions on many factors, one of which is the profit margin. It is used to compare between companies and influences the decision of investment in a particular venture. To attract investors, a high profit margin is preferred while comparing with similar businesses.

See also
Earnings before interest and taxes
Earnings before interest, taxes, depreciation, and amortization
Gross profit margin
Net income
Operating profit margin

References

Profit
Financial ratios